Abū Abdallāh al-Ḥusayn ibn Aḥmad al-Mughallis al-Marāghī (the epithet also appears as al-Mughallisī) was a tenth-century CE poet. He flourished around 381 AH/991 CE, being associated with the court of Bahāʾ al-Dawla. He is noted as one of the only known composers of Arabic riddles in the third century AH.

Epithets 
A few sources refer to Ibn al-Mughallis instead as al-Muflis ('the bankrupt'), but this is due to scribal confusion of the Arabic letters غ and ف: in medial position these look similar, and short vowels are not written, so that  'al-Mughallis' was miscopied as  'al-muflis'. Mughallis has been glossed to mean 'the one who tarries'.

The epithet  al-Marāghī has been thought to suggest that al-Mughallis originated in the Adharbayjani town of Maragheh.

Works
According to Bilal Orfali, the eleventh-century literary scholar ʻAbd al-Malik ibn Muḥammad Thaʻālibī quotes from al-Mughallis's poetry in many of his works. His poetry anthology Yatīma includes al-Mughallis's work in 'the third region of the Yatīma al-Dahr: on the clever curiosities of the inhabitants of Jibāl, Fārs, Jurjān, and Ṭabaristān'', specifically the eighth chapter, 'mention of all the poets of al-Jabal and those who went there from Iraq and other places, and the clever curiosities of their accounts and poems'. The collection quotes two riddles, on a touchstone and banner, and a little more poetry besides.

Thaʻālibī included more of al-Mughallis's poems in the sequel to the Yatīma, his Tatimma al-Yatīma, where al-Mughallis appears in the second region, entitled: 'completion of the second region on the beauties of the Iraqīs — rather, their best achievements and clever related curiosities'. According to both the Beirut edition of 1983 and Radwan's critical edition of 1972, the Tatimma records eleven riddles by al-Mughallis along with a brief excerpt from a ghazal.

Primary sources
 , vol. 13 p. 202 [no. 3555]
 ʿAbd al-Malik ibn Muḥammad Thaʿālibī, Yatīma:
 ʿAbd al-Malik ibn Muḥammad Thaʿālibī, Yatīmat al-dahr fī shuʿarāʾ ahl al-ʿaṣr (يتيمة الدهر في شعراء أهلالعصر), 4 vols (Damascus: [al-Maṭbaʿah al-Ḥifnīyah] دمشق : المطبعة الحفنية, 1302 AH [1885 CE]), II 228.
 Yatīmat al-dahr fī shuʿarāʾ ahl al-ʿaṣr , ed. by Muḥammad Muḥyī al-Dīn ʿAbd al-Ḥamīd , 4 vols (Cairo 1956), vol. 3 pp. 415–16.
 Yatīmat al-dahr fī maḥāsin ahl al-ʿaṣr maʿ al-tatimma wa-l-fahāris, ed. by Mufīd Muḥammad Qumayḥah, 6 vols (Bayrūt: Dār al-Kutub al-ʿIlmīyah, 1983), vol. 3 p. 463 (ch 34), p. 468 (ch 34), p. 481 (ch 42)
 ʻAbd al-Malik ibn Muḥammad Thaʻālibī, Tatimma:
 Ahmad Shawqi Radwan (ed.), 'Thaʿālibī's “Tatimmat al-Yatīmah”: A Critical Edition and a Study of the Author as Anthologist and Literary Critic' (unpublished PhD thesis, University of Manchester, 1972), pp. 67–69 [ch. 66].
 Yatīmat al-dahr fī maḥāsin ahl al-ʿaṣr maʿ al-tatimma wa-l-fahāris, ed. by Mufīd Muḥammad Qumayḥah, 6 vols (Bayrūt: Dār al-Kutub al-ʿIlmīyah, 1983), vol. 5 pp. 24-26 [al-Tatimma ch. 11].

References

Year of birth missing
Year of death missing
10th-century Arabic writers
10th-century Arabic poets
Buyid-period poets
People from Maragheh